Brian George James (21 March 1941 – 6 November 2002) was an English cricketer.  James was a right-handed batsman who bowled right-arm fast-medium.  He was born in Wolverhampton, Staffordshire.

James made his debut for Staffordshire in the 1962 Minor Counties Championship against Durham.  James played Minor counties cricket for Staffordshire from 1962 to 1973, which included 39 Minor Counties Championship matches. In 1973, he made his List A debut against Dorset in the Gillette Cup.  He made a further appearance in List A cricket, against Lancashire in the 2nd round of the same tournament. In his 2 List A matches, he scored 19 runs, while with the ball he took 3 wickets at a bowling average of 16.66, with best figures of 3/35.

He died in his hometown on 6 November 2002.

References

External links
Brian James at ESPNcricinfo
Brian James at CricketArchive

1941 births
2002 deaths
Cricketers from Wolverhampton
English cricketers
Staffordshire cricketers